Jabril Hassan Mohammed is a Somali international footballer who currently plays as a striker for Dong Thap and the Somalia national team.

International career
He has made at least three senior appearances for Somalia national football team including  some appearances in the 2013 CECAFA cup.

References

Living people
Somalian footballers
Somalia international footballers
Association football forwards
Elman FC players
1994 births
Dong Thap FC players